Thermal is an unincorporated community within the Coachella Valley in Riverside County, California, United States, located approximately  southeast of Palm Springs and about  north of the Salton Sea. It is served by area codes 760 and 442 and is in ZIP Code 92274. The population was 2,865 at the 2010 census. For statistical purposes, the United States Census Bureau has defined Thermal a census-designated place (CDP), which does not precisely correspond to the historical community.

History
December 30,1823 Bevret Captain Jose Romero leading an expeditionary military expedition finding a route to Tucson from San Gabriel passes In the foothills west of Thermal and Martinez Indian Village (South of Thermal). 
Thermal (originally Kokell) began as a railroad camp in 1910 for employees of the Southern Pacific Railroad, followed by Mecca (originally called Walters) in 1915 and Arabia in between, each with about 1,000 residents. Permanent dwellings were soon established on Avenue 56 (renamed Airport Boulevard), former U.S. Route 99 (State Route 86) and State Route 111 by the 1930s.

Agricultural development from canal irrigation made the area thrive in greenery by the 1950s, followed by the former Camp Young U.S. Naval Air station converted into Thermal Airport by 1965. In the early 1990s, a four-lane highway (State Route 86) was constructed over an earlier transportation route. There is a proposal for a major commercial aviation Airport known as the Jackie Cochran-Desert Cities Regional Airport on the same site.

An auto racetrack and club, a members-only racetrack near Jacqueline Cochran Regional Airport (Thermal Club), is under development and is being built on land originally owned by the Kohl family (owners of Kohl Department stores) and built-in partnership with them. The Kohls still own significant property in this area.

Geography
According to the United States Census Bureau, the CDP covers an area of 9.5  square miles (25.5  km), all of its land.

Climate
Thermal has a desert climate (BWh according to the Köppen climate classification). High mountain ranges on three sides contribute to its unique and year-round warm climate, with some of the warmest winters west of the Rocky Mountains. Summer highs above  occur on average 28 days per year and exceed  every other year. Summer nights often stay above . Winters are warm with daytime highs rarely below , although light freezes happen every year. The average annual precipitation is under , with over 348 days of sunshine per year.

Demographics
The 2010 United States Census reported that Thermal had a population of 2,865. The racial makeup of Thermal was 1,034 (36.1%) White, 28 (1.0%) African American, 30 (1.0%) Native American, 32 (1.1%) Asian, 1 (0.0%) Pacific Islander, 1,685 (58.8%) from other races, and 55 (1.9%) from two or more races. Hispanic or Latino of any race were 2,730 persons (95.3%).

The Census reported that 2,863 people (99.9% of the population) lived in households, 2 (<0.1%) lived in non-institutionalized group quarters, and 0 (0%) were institutionalized.

There were 684 households, out of which 452 (66.1%) had children under the age of 18 living in them, 410 (59.9%) were opposite-sex married couples living together, 113 (16.5%) had a female householder with no husband present, 87 (12.7%) had a male householder with no wife present.  There were 61 (8.9%) unmarried opposite-sex partnerships, and 6 (0.9%) same-sex married couples or partnerships. 55 households (8.0%) were made up of individuals, and 19 (2.8%) had someone living alone who was 65 years of age or older. The average household size was 4.19.  There were 610 families (89.2% of all households); the average family size was 4.36.

The population was spread out, with 1,070 people (37.3%) under the age of 18, 316 people (11.0%) aged 18 to 24, 781 people (27.3%) aged 25 to 44, 502 people (17.5%) aged 45 to 64, and 196 people (6.8%) who were 65 years of age or older.  The median age was 25.9 years. For every 100 females, there were 111.6 males.  For every 100 females age 18 and over, there were 109.5 males.

The homeowner vacancy rate was 0.7%; the rental vacancy rate was 6.7%.  1,162 people (40.6% of the population) lived in owner-occupied housing units and 1,701 people (59.4%) lived in rental housing units.

Education
There are several schools in the Coachella Valley Unified School District that are in and near the community. These include schools in Salton City, 20 miles south of Coachella, in Imperial County, California. In Thermal, they are Westside Elementary (K-6), Oasis Elementary (K-8), Mountain Vista Elementary (K-6), Saul Martinez Elementary (K-6), Mecca Elementary (K-6), Edward Park Elementary (K-5), Toro Canyon Middle (6-8), Bobby Duke Middle (6-8), John Kelley Elementary (K-6), Coachella Valley High (9-12), Cesar Chavez Elementary (K-6), Cahuilla Desert Academy (Junior High: 7th and 8th grade), Desert Mirage High School (9-12), West Shores High School (9-12) and La Familia Continuation High (9-12).

College of the Desert, a community college based in Palm Desert has opened a new satellite campus, the East Valley Educational Center, on the corner of 62nd Avenue and Buchanan Street.

Infrastructure

Transportation
Jacqueline Cochran Regional Airport (formerly Thermal Airport) is located about 1.6 miles southwest of the community. The Union Pacific Railroad owns and operates the former Southern Pacific Railroad mainline through Thermal.

The region is served by a two-lane expressway. California State Route 86 and California State Route 111 are modern transportation corridors that serve as a fruit shipping and international trucking route to connect with Interstate 10 in Indio.

Cemeteries
The Toro Cemetery is located on Monroe Street.

The Torres-Martinez Desert Cahuilla Indians maintain a small (48 interments) cemetery on Martinez Road.

Thermal Club

References
 Nordland, Ole J., History of the Coachella Valley County Water District, Second Ed., (Coachella, California: Coachella Valley Water District, 1978).
 Map: "Road Map of California, 1958," (Sacramento, California: State of California, Department of Public Works, Division of Highways).
 California Region Timetable: 14, (Modesto, California: Altamont Press, 2003).
 U.S. Department of Education, National Center for Educational Statistics

Notes

External links
 

Census-designated places in Riverside County, California
Populated places in the Colorado Desert
Coachella Valley
Census-designated places in California